Dropping Knowledge (styled "dropping knowledge") is a non-profit organization in the United States and Germany. In the US, Dropping Knowledge International is a project of the Tides Center, a non-profit fiscal sponsor and registered 501(c)3.  In Germany, Dropping Knowledge e.V. is an Eingetragener Verein.  Both organizations aim to foster discussion of the world's social and environmental problems. Founded in the US in 2003, the organization hosted a large discussion in Berlin on September 9, 2006.

The organization was founded by German filmmaker Ralf Schmerberg, American filmmaker Cindy Gantz, and American activist Jackie Wallace, originally as a response to the Iraq War, but from its inception aimed to be more than a mere "anti-movement": dropping knowledge became an interactive platform for questions, concerns and initiatives from around the world, as well as a meeting place for concerned world citizens striving to turn apathy into action.

The nine-hour discussion, named The Table of Free Voices and overseen by German Foreign Minister Frank-Walter Steinmeier, used a large round table on the Bebelplatz in Berlin. 112 international artists, philosophers, scientists and human rights activists were invited to simultaneously answer 100 selected questions, recorded by 112 cameras and microphones. The questions had been collected on the organization's website beginning in September 2005. The questions were read out loud by moderators Hafsat Abiola and Willem Dafoe. Prominent participants included Cornel West, Bianca Jagger, Hans-Peter Dürr, John Gage, Bill Joy, Harry Wu and Wim Wenders.

Transcripts and videos were later released on the project's website under a copyleft license, organized in a "Living Library" developed by the Deutsche  Forschungszentrum für Künstliche Intelligenz in Saarbrücken (German Research Institute for Artificial Intelligence).

The cost of the event was 5 million Euros; initial funding came from the Wallace Foundation  and The Mark and Sharon Bloome Fund, the Allianz insurance company contributed 2.7 million Euro in 2005, and Volkswagen also made a sizable donation.

dropping knowledge has also produced and is distributing several short films, all under the "dropping knowledge Copyleft License" which places some restrictions on commercial use: it forbids to use the content for commercial advertising.

Participants

Yassin Adnan
Martin Almada
Udi Aloni
Ekaterina Moshaeva
Homero Aridjis
Mohammed Arkoun
Anthony Arnove
Jwan M. Aziz
Rodrigo Baggio
Dedi Baron
Mark Benecke
Ana Lucy Bengochea
Sihem Bensedrine
Roland Berger
Abbas Beydoun
Andries Botha
Kamal Boullata
Tania Brugera
Donato Bayu Bay Bumacas
Gladman Chibememe
Robbie Conal
Bora Cosic
Catherine David
Hans-Peter Dürr
Steve Earle
Rachid ElDaif
Sabiha El-Zayat-Erbakan
Jodie Evans
Benjamin Fahrer
Raymond Federman
Giora Feidman
Viviana Figueroa
John Gage
Ashok Gangadean
Susan George
Eddie Glaude
Jonathan Granoff
Jesper Green
Nadja Halilbegovich
Govindaswamy Hariramamurthi

Mae-Wan Ho
Lillian Holt
Kigge Hvid
Pico Iyer
Bianca Jagger
Bill Joy
Dritëro Kasapi
China Keitetsi
Audrey Kitagawa
Takashi Kiuchi
Paul Knight
Anuradha Koirala
Song Kosal
Michael Laitman
Ervin Laszlo
Yungchen Lhamo
Fang Lijun
Tegla Loroupe
Geert Lovink
Sohrab Mahdavi
Livingstone Maluleke
Jerry Mander
Neela Marikkar
Fred Matser
Jonathan Meese
Mayank R. Mehta
Valentina Melnikova
Paul D. (aka DJ Spooky) Miller
Anuradha Mittal
Esther Mwaura-Muiru
Helena Norberg-Hodge
Oscar Olivera
Vesna Pesic
Mohau Pheko
Leung Ping-kwan
Sydney Possuelo
Eliane Potiguara
Swami Pragyapad
José Manuel Prieto

Avi Primor
Wolfram Putz
Monira Rahman
Lesego Rampolokeng
Alvaro Restrepo
Simon Retallack
Stephanie Robinson
Santiago Roncagliolo
Masuma Bibi Russel
Elisabet Sahtouris
Masami Saionji
Kailash Satyarthi
Beverly Schwartz
Norbert Servos
Mahsa Shekarloo
Sulak Sivaraksa
Tavis Smiley
Fernando Solanas
Thenmozhi Soundararajan
Timothy Speed
Tamas St. Auby
Jonathan Stack
Pauline Tangiora
Michael E. Tigar
Oliviero Toscani
Michael P. Totten
Galsan Tschinag
Benson Venegas
Constantin von Barloewen
Sima Wali
Kurt Weidemann
Tu Weiming
Eliot Weinberger
Brian J. Weller
Wim Wenders
Cornel West
Harry Wu
Shaobin Yang
Irina Yasina
Sanar Yurdatapan

Problema: The Film
Ralf Schmerberg released a documentary film about the Table of Voices called Problema, which is available to watch or download for free online. The film was directed and edited by Schmerberg and features not only selections from the 112 responses to the 100 questions, but also visual footage from various historical, news, documentary and artistic sources. Some of the visual footage included scenes from the films of Sergei Eisenstein, Godfrey Reggio, Abel Gance, Alain Resnais, Mohsen Makhmalbaf, Guy Debord, and Fritz Lang.

References

External links
 www.droppingknowledge.org, official website
 Press coverage of The Table of Free Voices
 Problema The Film

Non-profit organisations based in Berlin